Weihe  is a town in southern Heilongjiang province, China, located just off of G10 Suifenhe–Manzhouli Expressway,  from Shangzhi, which administers it. , It has 3 residential communities and 13 villages under its administration.

See also
List of township-level divisions of Heilongjiang

References

Township-level divisions of Heilongjiang
Shangzhi